NK BSK Bijelo Brdo is a Croatian football club based in the village of Bijelo Brdo in eastern Slavonia. As of the 2022–23 season they compete in the First Football League.

History
According to RSSSF, the club was re-founded in 2002 playing at the Croatian fifth level.

As winners of the regional Osijek-Baranja County Cup, they entered the preliminary round of the 2010–11 Croatian Cup. After beating NK Mladost Petrinja they progressed through to the first round proper, in which they were knocked out by NK Varaždin. They secured promotion to the Treća HNL East after winning the 4.HNL East group, and then won the 2011–12 Treća HNL East group with an undefeated record over 29 games (one team folded at mid-season.) However they did not obtain a license for the second league and were not promoted.

BSK was finally promoted to the newly expanded second division in 2018. This was their debut season in the second tier.

Current squad

Honours 
 Treća HNL – East:
Winners (1): 2011–12

References

Association football clubs established in 1935
Football clubs in Croatia
Football clubs in Osijek-Baranja County
1935 establishments in Croatia